Drepanolejeunea senticosa is a species of liverwort in the family Lejeuneaceae. It is native to Cuba. The species is listed as critically endangered by the IUCN.

References

Flora of Cuba
Critically endangered plants
Lejeuneaceae